Kenneth Doniell Moore (August 20, 1974 – October 14, 2007), better known by his stage name Big Moe, was an American rapper from Houston, Texas.

Early life
Kenneth Doniell Moore was born in Houston, Texas on August 20, 1974, and he grew up in southeast Houston. In 1992 he graduated from Yates High School, where he was a football star.

Career
Originating from Houston, Texas, and as one of the founding members of the "Original Screwed Up Click," Big Moe started out in music by freestyling on DJ Screw mixtapes like many of his Houston peers before being signed to Wreckshop Records. Wreckshop Records released Big Moe's debut album, City of Syrup in (2000); the title was a nod to Houston's reputation for drinking codeine-laced syrup, which Moe pours from a Styrofoam cup on the album's cover. The album featured the single "Mann!", which Moe intended to be the South Side's answer to Black Rob's East Coast hit "Whoa!"

In 2002, Moe returned with his second album, Purple World. This release showcased a "who's who" of Houston vocalists and two versions of Moe's breakthrough single, "Purple Stuff." The Willy Wonka and the Chocolate Factory-themed video for "Purple Stuff" was played on MTV, and the album peaked at No. 3 on Billboards Top R&B/Hip-Hop Albums chart. Big Moe's third and last album, Moe Life, was issued in 2003, including the commercially successful single "Just a Dog." A posthumous album entitled Unfinished Business was released on March 18, 2008, via Wreckshop Records and Koch Records. In 2009 his album City of Syrup was named number 25 on houstonpress.com's list of the 25 Best Houston Hip-Hop Albums.

Death
Moe died on October 14, 2007 at 33 years old, after suffering a heart attack one week earlier that left him in a coma.

Discography

Studio albums

Guest appearances

References

1974 births
2007 deaths
African-American male rappers
American male rappers
Drug-related deaths in Texas
MNRK Music Group artists
Gangsta rappers
Place of death missing
Priority Records artists
Rappers from Houston
Screwed Up Click members
Southern hip hop musicians
Underground rappers
20th-century American male musicians
20th-century African-American musicians
21st-century African-American people